Yefim Gordon (born 1950 in Vilnius, Soviet Union) is a Lithuanian aircraft photographer and author who specializes in Soviet aircraft and Russian aviation.

Biography
Gordon graduated in 1972 from the Polytechnic Institute Kaunas as an engineer / electronic technician. Since 1973 he lives in Moscow, where he collected as a hobby photographs and books on the history of Soviet aviation. This collection became a large archive. Since the 1980s he is a professional aviation journalist and writer. He has authored and co-authored about 100 books on Soviet and Russian aviation in Russian, English, Polish and Czech, published articles in nearly 100 journals and photo reports. He also works as a photographer. The 2018 edition of Jane's All The World's Aircraft shows 50 of his photographs.

Gordon is co-owner of the Moscow aviation publisher Polygon Press Ltd. His works are also distributed by Midland publishing (now Ian Allan Publishing), Hikoki Publications Japan and Crécy publishing ltd. As a co-author, he regularly collaborates with Dmitri and Sergei Komissarov.

Publications (selection)
with Vladimir Rigman Tupolev Tu-144 Hinckley, Leicestershire Midland 2005 
with Vladimir Rigmant OKB Tupolev. A History of the Design Bureau and its Aircraft Hinckley, Leicestershire Midland 2005 
Tupolev Tu-144 Hinckley, Leicestershire Midland 2006 
RedStar Number 33 Antonov An-12: The Soviet Hercules with Dmitri Komissarov Hinckley Midland 2007 
with Sergei & Dmitry Komissarov U.S. Aircraft in the Soviet Union and Russia Midland Publishing 2009 
with Vladimir Rigmant OKB Tupolev Midland Publishing 2000  325-327
Unflown Wings: Soviet / Russian Unrealized Aircraft Projects 1925–2010 with Sergei Komissarov Birmingham Ian Allen Publishing 2013 
with Sergei Komissarov OKB Sukhoi A History of the Design Bureau and its Aircraft Ian Allen Publishing 

Famous Russian Aircraft Series

 Mikoyan MiG-31 (2020) 
 Sukhoi Su-25 ( 2020 ) 
 Mikoyan MiG-23 & MiG-27 (2019)   
 Mikoyan MiG-29  & MiG-35 (2019)  
 Sukhoi Su-27  & 30/33/34/35 (2019) 
 Tupolev Tu-95  & Tu-142 (2018) 
 Mikoyan MiG-19 (2017) 
 Mikoyan MiG-17 (2016)  
 Ilyushin IL-28 (2016) 
 Sukhoi Su-24 (2015) 
 Tupolev  TU-22/TU-22M  (2012) 
 Sukhoi Su-7  and Su17/20/22 Fighter Bomber Family (2012) 
 Mikoyan MiG-15 (2011) 
 Ilyushin  Il-2/Il-10 (2010) 
 Mikoyan MiG-21 (2008) 
 Sukhoi Su-27 (2007) 
 Mikoyan  MiG-29 (2007) 
Red Star Series

 Sukhoi S-37 and Mikoyan MFI: Russian Fifth-Generation Fighter Technology, Red Star Volume 1, 
 Flankers: The New Generation, Red Star Volume 2, 
 Polikarpov's I-16 Fighter: Its Forerunners and Progeny, Red Star Volume 3, 
 Early Soviet Jet Fighters: The 1940s and Early 1950s, Red Star Volume 4, 
 Yakovlev's Piston-Engined Fighters, Red Star Volume 5, 
 Polikarpov's Biplane Fighters, Red Star Volume 6, 
 Tupolev Tu-4: Soviet Superfortress, Red Star Volume 7, 
 Tupolev Tu-160 Blackjack: Russia's Answer to the B-1, Red Star Volume 9,  
 Lavochkin's Piston-Engined Fighters, Red Star Volume 10, 
 Myasischev M-4 and 3M: The First Soviet Strategic Jet Bomber, Red Star Volume 11, 
 Antonov's Turboprop Twins: An-24/An-26/An-30/An-32, Red Star Volume 12, 
 Mikoyan's Piston-Engined Fighters, Red Star Volume 13, 
 Mil Mi-8/Mi-17: Rotary-Wing Workhorse and Warhorse, Red Star Volume 14, 
 Antonov An-2: Annushka, Maid of all Work, Red Star Volume 15, 
 Sukhoi Interceptors: The Su-9/-11/-15 and other types, Red Star Volume 16, 
 Early Soviet Jet Bombers: The 1940s and Early 1950s, Red Star Volume 17, 
 Antonov's Heavy Transports: Big Lifters for War and Peace, Red Star Volume 18, 
 Soviet Heavy Interceptors, Red Star Volume 19, 
 Soviet/Russian Unmanned Aerial Vehicles, Red Star Volume 20, 
 Antonov's Jet Twins: The An-72/-74 Family, Red Star Volume 21, 
 Mil's Heavylift Helicopters: Mi-6/Mi-10/V-12/Mi-26, Red Star Volume 22, 
 Soviet/Russian AWACS Aircraft: Tu-126, A-50, An-71 and Ka-31, Red Star Volume 23, 
 Tupolev Tu-144: Russia's Concorde, Red Star Volume 24, 
 Ilyushin IL-12 and IL-14: Successors to the Li-2, Red Star Volume 25, 
 Russia's Military Aircraft in the 21st Century, Red Star Volume 26, 
 Lisunov Li-2: The Soviet DC-3, Red Star Volume 27, 
 Beriev's Jet Flying Boats, Red Star Volume 28, 
 Kamov -27/-32 Family, Red Star Volume 29, 
 Soviet Rocket Fighters, Red Star Volume 30, 
 Tupolev Tu-114: The First Soviet Intercontinental Airliner, Red Star Volume 31, 
 Lavochkin's Last Jets, Red Star Volume 32, 
 Antonov An-12: The Soviet Hercules, Red Star Volume 33, 
 Mikoyan MiG-25 Foxbat: Guardian of the Soviet Borders, Red Star Volume 34, 

Soviet Secret Projects Series

 Soviet Secret Projects: Fighters Since 1946 v. 2 (2005) 
 Soviet Secret Projects: Bombers Since 1945 v. 1 (2004)

References

External links

1950 births
Aviation writers
Lithuanian photographers
Writers from Moscow
Writers from Vilnius
Living people